Leo Henry (March 10, 1911 – May 16, 1992), nicknamed "Preacher", was an American Negro league pitcher in the 1930s and 1940s.

A native of Inverness, Florida, Henry made his Negro leagues debut in 1937 with the Jacksonville Red Caps. He played six seasons with the club as it moved to Cleveland and then back to Jacksonville, and was selected to play in the 1941 East–West All-Star Game. Henry served in the US Army during World War II, and finished his baseball career with the Indianapolis Clowns from 1946 to 1948. He died in Jacksonville, Florida in 1992 at age 81.

References

External links
 and Baseball-Reference Black Baseball stats and Seamheads

1911 births
1992 deaths
Cincinnati Clowns players
Cleveland Bears players
Indianapolis Clowns players
Jacksonville Red Caps players
20th-century African-American sportspeople
Baseball pitchers
United States Army personnel of World War II
African Americans in World War II
African-American United States Army personnel